Howard Odell (November 30, 1910 – October 30, 2000) was an American football player and coach.  He was the head coach at Yale University from 1943 to 1947, and at the University of Washington from 1948 to 1952, compiling a career record of 58–40–4. Born to Harry H. Odell, Howie Odell was one of six children.

Odell missed his first season with Washington in 1948 with a kidney ailment. He was fired by the athletic director after his fifth season with the Huskies in December 1952, after a 7–3 season and a third-place finish in the Pacific Coast Conference. Odell was officially let go by the university's board of regents a month later.

Odell opened a used car lot and was a television sportscaster, and ran for the Seattle City Council in 1954. He was elected to the King County Commission in 1957 and served until 1962. He then retired and moved to southern California, and spent his later years teaching ballroom dancing, working on hydroplanes, and playing golf.

Head coaching record

References

1910 births
2000 deaths
King County Councillors
Harvard Crimson football coaches
Penn Quakers football coaches
Pittsburgh Panthers football coaches
Pittsburgh Panthers football players
Washington Huskies football coaches
Wisconsin Badgers football coaches
Yale Bulldogs football coaches
People from Adams County, Iowa
Players of American football from Iowa